The name Helen or  Hellen  has been used for twenty tropical cyclones worldwide: sixteen in the Western Pacific Ocean (five regionally in the Philippines by PAGASA), one in the North Indian Ocean, one in the South-West Indian Ocean, and two in the Australian region.

In the Western Pacific:
 Typhoon Helen (1945)
 Typhoon Helen (1954) (T5406)
 Typhoon Helen (1958) (T5821) – struck Japan.
 Typhoon Helen (1961) (T6110, 31W)
 Typhoon Helen (1964) (T6411, 14W)
 Tropical Storm Helen (1966) (T6624, 26W) – struck Japan.
 Typhoon Helen (1969) (T6914, 18W)
 Typhoon Helen (1972) (T7220, 20W, Paring) – struck Japan.
 Tropical Storm Helen (1975) (T7518, 21W)
 Tropical Storm Helen (1992) (T9208, 08W)
 Typhoon Helen (1995) (T9505, 08W, Karing) – struck southern China.
 Typhoon Dianmu (2004) (T0406, 09W, Helen)
 Typhoon Kalmaegi (2008) (T0807, 08W, Helen)
 Typhoon Kai-tak (2012) (T1213, 14W, Helen) – made landfall in the Philippines and China.
 Typhoon Megi (2016) (T1617, 20W, Helen) - made landfall in Taiwan as a Category 4 typhoon. 
 Tropical Storm Higos (2020) (T2007, 08W, Helen) - affected the Philippines and China.

In the North Indian:
 Cyclone Helen (2013) – affected Andhra Pradesh and Tamil Nadu

In the South-West Indian:
Cyclone Hellen (2014) – one of the most powerful tropical cyclones in the Mozambique Channel on record.

In the Australian Region:
 Cyclone Helen (1974)
 Cyclone Helen (2008)

Australian region cyclone set index articles
Pacific typhoon set index articles
North Indian cyclone set index articles
South-West Indian Ocean cyclone set index articles